CS Universitatea Cluj-Napoca is a Romanian sports society from Cluj-Napoca, Romania. Founded in September 1919 by the "Sports Society of University Students". Its first chairman was Prof. Iuliu Haţieganu, famous doctor and politician.

External links 
Official Websites
 u-cluj.ro CS Universitatea Cluj-Napoca Official Website
 universitateacluj.ro CFM Universitatea Cluj-Napoca Official Website
 utrustulcre.ro Universitatea Trustul CRE Cluj-Napoca Official Website
 u-mobitelco.ro Universitatea Mobitelco Cluj-Napoca Official Website
 uhandbal.ro Universitatea Jolidon Cluj-Napoca Official Website
 utransilvania.ro Universitatea Transilvania Cluj-Napoca Official Website
 u-volei.ro/ Universitatea Cluj-Napoca (Volleyball) Official Website
 CFM U Cluj at the official Liga II website

Fan Websites
 ucluj.ro Official Fans' Website

Sport in Cluj-Napoca
Sports clubs established in 1919
Multi-sport clubs in Romania
University and college sports clubs
Universitatea Cluj-Napoca